Thyrsa Anne Frazier Svager (June 16, 1930 – July 23, 1999) was an American academic who was one of the first African-American woman to gain a PhD in mathematics. Born in Ohio, she graduated from high school at the age of 16, going to Antioch College in Ohio and then doing her postgraduate degrees at Ohio State University. Frazier Svager was the head of the Department of Mathematics at Central State University (CSU) in Ohio for decades, ending her academic career as provost and dean for academic affairs. She and her husband, physics professor Aleksandar Svager, invested one of their salaries during their careers to build a legacy for scholarships. After her death, the Thyrsa Frazier Svager Fund was established to provide scholarships for African-American women majoring in mathematics.

Early life and education

Frazier Svager was born Thyrsa Anne Frazier on June 16, 1930, in Wilberforce, Ohio. Her mother, Elizabeth Anne Frazier, taught speech at Central State University (CSU), a historically black university in Wilberforce, Ohio. Her father, G. Thuton Frazier, headed the Logistics Department at the Wright-Patterson Air Force Base in Dayton, Ohio. She was a member of the Kappa Alpha Psi fraternity, holding the position of Polemarch in the province. Frazier Svager had three sisters, Gail, Constance and Jane, and a brother, William Lafayette.

Frazier Svager graduated from Wilberforce University Preparatory Academy in Ohio at the age of 16 in 1947, as class valedictorian. She attended Antioch College, a private liberal arts college in Yellow Springs, Ohio, majoring in mathematics, with a minor in chemistry, and placed in the 99th percentile in the Princeton Senior Student Examination. Frazier Svager was one of only four black students at Antioch: one of the others was Coretta Scott King, with whom she was friends.

She gained a Bachelor of Arts degree from Antioch in 1951, going on to gain a master's (1952) and PhD from Ohio State University (OSU) in Columbus in 1965, where Paul Reichelderfer was her doctoral advisor. Her dissertation was titled "On the product of absolutely continuous transformations of measure spaces".

Career
Frazier Svager worked for a year at Wright-Patterson Air Force Base in Dayton, before teaching at Texas Southern University in Houston. In 1954, she joined the faculty of CSU in Wilberforce.

In 1967, Frazier Svager was appointed chairman of the department of mathematics. She was awarded tenure in 1970. She spent a summer in DC in 1966 as a systems analyst at NASA, as visiting faculty at MIT in 1969, and in 1985, she undertook postdoctoral study at OSU during the summer. She was provost and vice president for academic affairs when she retired in 1993. In March 1995, she returned for a short time to CSU as Interim President.

Frazier Svager was active on the issue of scholarships, serving as the president of the local chapter of MOLES, a national association that provided scholarships for college students. She was also a member of Beta Kappa Chi, the National Association of Mathematicians, and the Mathematical Association of America, and was involved with Jack and Jill of America. Frazier Svager participated in the meeting that founded the National Association of Mathematics in 1969.

She wrote two books, CSU's Modern Elementary Algebra Workbook (1969), and Essential Mathematics for College Freshmen (1976).

Personal life
While on the CSU faculty, Frazier met Aleksandar Svager, a Holocaust survivor from Yugoslavia and physics professor at CSU. They married in June 1968 at her parents' home.

Thyrsa Frazier Svager died on July 23, 1999.

Philanthropy
Both university professors with a strong commitment to furthering education opportunities, the Svagers lived on one income, investing the other to build a scholarship fund. After her death, her husband established the Thyrsa Frazier Svager Fund at the Dayton Foundation, for African-American women who major in mathematics at one of six universities, with a legacy contribution planned. As of February 2017, 33 women had received support from the Fund. An annual contribution is also being made to the American Physical Society's Minority Scholarship.

Honors
Frazier Svager was honored with an Honorary Doctor of Humane Letters by CSU on her retirement, and she was inducted into the Hall of Fame in Greene County, Ohio.

References

External links
 
Tribute to Thyrsa Frazier Svager on YouTube (Dayton Foundation).
Thyrsa Frazier Svager Scholarship Fund.

African-American women academics
African-American academics
African-American mathematicians
1930 births
1999 deaths
20th-century American mathematicians
People from Wilberforce, Ohio
Central State University faculty
Ohio State University Graduate School alumni
Antioch College alumni
American women mathematicians
American women academics
Texas Southern University faculty
20th-century women mathematicians
20th-century African-American women
20th-century African-American people